Suvodol  is a village in the municipality of Smederevo, Serbia. According to the 2002 census, the village had a population of 849.

References

Populated places in Podunavlje District